The Scottish Play is a play by American playwright Lee Blessing. It is set at a Shakespeare festival in Bannockburn, Michigan and examines the history of the Scottish Play curse associated with theater workers and performers pronouncing the name Macbeth.

Plays by Lee Blessing
2005 plays
Plays and musicals based on Macbeth
Plays set in Michigan